Charles Bilot (10 March 1883 – 17 September 1912) was a French footballer. He competed in the men's tournament at the 1908 Summer Olympics.

References

External links
 
 
 

1883 births
1912 deaths
French footballers
France international footballers
Olympic footballers of France
Footballers at the 1908 Summer Olympics
Place of birth missing
Association football defenders
France B international footballers
CA Paris-Charenton players